Dil Se Dil Tak ( From heart to heart) is an Indian Hindi-language love triangle show that was loosely based on the 2001 Bollywood film Chori Chori Chupke Chupke. The series aired on Colors TV from 30 January 2017 to 1 June 2018 and starred Sidharth Shukla, Rashami Desai, Jasmin Bhasin, Rohan Gandotra and Mohammed Iqbal Khan.

Plot
Parth Bhanushali, the heir to the conservative and affluent Bhanushali family based in Vadodara, falls in love with and marries their Bengali employee Shorvori Bhattacharya at the cost of being disowned by his family.

2 years later
Shorvori is pregnant and Parth's family accepts her. An unfortunate accident results in Shorvori's miscarriage, rendering her infertile. She and Parth hide the miscarriage from his family. Teni, a carefree Gujarati wanting settlement in the US, is chosen by Parth and Shorvori as a surrogate in return for sending her to the US. She gets pregnant with the couple's child via IVF. Shorvori introduces Teni as her cousin to the family. They start to live together. Teni slowly falls in love with Parth and ends up confessing it to him. They are in turmoil after the revelations regarding Teni's pregnancy as Parth accepts the baby to be his. The family eventually accepts the surrogacy situation. Due to a misunderstanding, Shorvori ends her relationship with Parth thinking that he has an extramarital affair with Teni and is cheating on her. Teni discovers that Shorvori has a fatal brain tumour and pretended to leave Parth to help him deal with her impending death. Shorvori sends divorce papers. Parth is suspicious of her behaviour. Shorvori meets with an accident and is presumed dead. Parth struggles to cope with the pain of losing her. Teni convinces him to move on. Due to a misunderstanding, Parth accuses Teni of murdering Shorvori. Teni goes into premature labour and delivers a girl named Ipshita. With Teni's life in danger, Parth donates blood to save her life. In return, she fulfils his demand that she leave the house. Eventually,  Parth realises that Teni did not kill Shorvori. He develops a love for Teni. When she plans to leave for the US, Parth confesses his love and she accepts his proposal. Shorvori is actually alive and was in a coma. Shorvori arrives to reclaim Parth on his wedding day but leaves, seeing him with Teni. The two reach Nainital to find Shorvori. In Nainital, she starts working as a music teacher. Parth believes he was imagining Shorvori and consummates his marriage with Teni. However, they come across Shorvori. All of them arrive home. Teni tries to leave the family. However, the three of them decide to live together. Misunderstandings arise between Shorvori and Teni who is about to leave but falls down and loses her memory. Shorvori understands that Parth loves Teni more than her and blesses him. Suspecting Bhanushalis wanting to sell her off, Teni runs away from their home.

6 years later

Shorvori is dead. Teni has been missing. The family sees Teni's traits in Ipshita. Teni leads a happy life in Delhi and is a sales manager, who is about to marry Iqbal. Circumstances lead to Parth and Teni meeting each other. Confused, Teni moves back to Baroda to find out about her past. Bhanushalis tell Teni everything, and she regains her memory as well as feelings for Parth. Teni decides to marry Iqbal who calls off the wedding. He gives them his blessings as he just wants Teni to be happy. As Iqbal leaves, Parth and Teni finally reunite living happily with Ipshita and their family.

Cast

Main
Sidharth Shukla / Rohan Gandotra as Parth Bhanushali – Ramnik and Indu's son; Jagruti's brother; Shorvori's widower; Teni's husband; Ipshita's father (2017–18).
Rashami Desai as Shorvori Bhattacharya Bhanushali – Bhanushalis' former employee; Parth's first wife; Ipshita's mother (2017–18) (Dead).
Jasmin Bhasin as Teni Bhanushali – Iqbal's ex-fiancée; Parth's second wife; Ipshita's surrogate and adoptive mother (2017–18).
 Chahat Tewani as Ipshita Bhanushali – Parth and Shorvori's daughter; Teni's surrogate and adopted daughter (2018).
 Mohammed Iqbal Khan as Iqbal – Teni's ex-fiancé; Parth's friend. (2018).

Recurring
 Tej Sapru as Purushottam Bhanushali: Patriarch of the Bhanushali family; Ambika's husband; Ramnik, Shyamnik and Jalpa's father; Parth, Sejal, Suyog, Jagruti, Sparsh and Jayu's grandfather; Ipshita's great-grandfather (2017−18)
 Dolly Minhas as Ambika Bhanushali: Matriarch of the Bhanushali family; Ramnik, Shyamnik and Jalpa's mother; Parth, Sejal, Suyog, Jagruti, Sparsh and Jayu's grandmother; Ipshita's great-grandmother (2017−18)
 Sachin Parikh as Ramnik Bhanushali: Purushottam and Ambika's son; Shyamnik and Jalpa's brother; Indu's husband; Parth and Jagruti's father; Ipshita's grandfather (2017−18)
 Vaishnavi Mahant as Indu Rajvansh Bhanushali: Poyni's sister; Ramnik's wife; Parth and Jagruti's mother; Ipshita's grandmother (2017−18)
 Himani Sharma as Sejal Bhanushali: Parth’s cousin; Poyni’s daughter; Suyog’s Sister (2017–18)
 Gouri Agarwal as Jagruti Bhanushali: Ramnik and Indu's daughter; Parth's sister (2017–18)
 Mayank Arora as Rishab: Fake love interest of Jagruti and Sejal (2017)
 Urvashi Upadhyay as Poyni Rajvansh Bhanushali: Indu's sister; Shyamnik's wife; Sejal and Suyog's mother; Ipshita's grandaunt (2017–18)
 Karan Godhwani as Suyog Bhanushali: Poyni and Shyamnik's son; Sejal's brother; Forum's husband (2017–18)
 Pooja Singh as Forum Bhanushali: Suyog's wife (2017–18)
 Khyaati Keshwani as Jalpa Bhanushali Kumar: Purushottam and Ambika's daughter; Bharat's wife; Jayu's mother (2017–18)
 Jignesh Joshi as Dr. Bharat Kumar: Jalpa's husband; Jayu's father (2017–18)
 Yashkant Sharma as Chutkan: Teni's younger brother
Kanika Maheshwari as Madamji, a trafficker (2017) 
 Abhilash Chaudhary as Munna, a detective
 Puja Sharma as Priya: Bharat's ex-girlfriend Sparsh real mother
Abha Parmar as Ammi: Iqbal's mother; Teni's ex-mother in law (2018)
 Zubeida Verma as Khala, Iqbal's maternal aunt 
 Tamanna Arora as Rashida, Iqbal's ex-fiancée/cousin, Khala's daughter
 Vansh Sayani as Sparsh Kumar: Bharat's and Priya's son, Jalpa's stepson

Special appearances 
 Samridh Bawa as Karan Singh Chauhan from Ek Shringaar-Swabhiman
 Sahil Uppal as Kunal Singh Chauhan from Ek Shringaar-Swabhiman
 Ankitta Sharma as Naina Karan Singh Chauhan from Ek Shringaar-Swabhiman
 Sangeita Chauhan as Meghna Kunal Singh Chauhan from Ek Shringaar-Swabhiman
 Avika Gor as Anushka Sangwan from Laado 2

Production
The Series is produced by Shashi Sumeet Productions of Shashi Mittal and Sumeet Hukamchand Mittal. The series was initially titled Sangharsh. Later, Its title was changed to Dil Se Dil Tak.

Casting
Earlier, Mishal Raheja was finalised to play the lead role in the series which was tentatively titled 'Sangharsh'. He was being considered for playing Salman Khan's character from the film Chori Chori Chupke Chupke on whose storyline this show is based upon. Then, there were also rumours that Shashank Vyas will play the lead, but he took up Jaana Na Dil Se Door, whom he has signed a year before. In September 2016, he was replaced by Sidharth Shukla to play the lead role.At about the same time, Jasmin Bhasin (last seen in Tashan-e-Ishq) was finalised for the role  played by Preity Zinta in Chori Chori Chupke Chupke. There were rumours that Chhavi Pandey would be romancing Mishal Raheja in the Series and would play the role of Rani Mukherjee from the film Chori Chori Chupke Chupke. There were also rumours that Ragini Nandwani would play the Female Lead in the show but she declined it. Sanjeeda Sheikh Tina Dutta, Sukirti Kandpal, Kritika Kamra, Aishwarya Sakhuja and Shraddha Arya were the actresses with whom the Production was also in talks to play the role of Rani Mukherjee from the film Chori Chori Chupke Chupke on whose storyline this show is based upon. Finally, in late September, Rashami Desai was chosen for the role from a group of talented actresses, like Chhavi Pandey, Sukirti Kandpal, Tina Dutta, Aishwarya Sakhuja, Kritika Kamra, Sanjeeda Sheikh and Shraddha Arya, who were short-listed for the role.  Later, the Show's title was changed to Dil Se Dil Tak. Thus, Finally, Rashami Desai, Sidharth Shukla and Jasmin Bhasin were finalised to play the Lead Roles in Dil Se Dil Tak. In March 2017, Manish Raisinghan auditioned for the role played by Sidharth Shukla in the Show but later Sidharth Shukla decided not to walk out of the Show. After a few months, Rashami Desai's Character was shown to have been killed in a car accident when she decided to walk out of the Show. Later, in December 2017, Sidharth Shukla finally left the show and was replaced by Rohan Gandotra. In January 2018, Rashami Desai made a comeback in the Series but finally left the Series in March 2018 when her character was shown to have died in the show. Mohammed Iqbal Khan has most recently entered the Series to play the Lead Role along with Rohan and Jasmin. It then starred Rohan Gandotra, Jasmin Bhasin and Mohammed Iqbal Khan in the Lead Role.

Broadcast 
Dil Se Dil Tak premiered on 30 January 2017 and aired Monday to Friday replacing Bigg Boss 10. The series was last time aired on Colors TV on 1 June 2018. The series was again aired on Colors TV because of the popular demand and due to the deadly COVID-19 all show's shooting was stopped and the formerly popular and demanded shows were reaired.

Reception 
The series gained early popularity because of Sidharth Shukla and Rashami Desai's onscreen chemistry. The series' target rating points (TRPs) declined after the actors left the show, and the series ended on 1 June 2018. The series was replaced by the Colors TV drama Silsila Badalte Rishton Ka from 4 June 2018.

References

External links 
 Official website

2017 Indian television series debuts
Hindi-language television shows
Indian drama television series
Indian television soap operas
Colors TV original programming
Shashi Sumeet Productions series
2018 Indian television series endings